The 2009 Uzbek League season was the 18th edition of top level football in Uzbekistan since independence in 1992

Bunyodkor were the defending champions from the 2008 campaign.

Pakhtakor hold the most titles with 8 Uzbek League crowns to their name.

Clubs and locations

 O.T.M.K. Olmaliq changed name to Olmaliq FK
 FK Dustlik Jizzakh withdrew because of financial problems and were replaced by FK Buxoro

Managerial changes

League table

Season statistics

Top goalscorers

Last updated: 17.11.2009

Top assists

Last updated: 2009-11-17 
Source: 2009 season Top assists

References

External links
 Table on RSSSF

Uzbekistan Super League seasons
1
Uzbek
Uzbek